Events in the year 1878 in Portugal.

Incumbents
 Monarch: Louis I
 Prime Minister: Fontes Pereira de Melo

Events
 13 October – Portuguese legislative election, 1878

Arts and entertainment

Sports

Births

 6 April – Carolina Beatriz Ângelo, physician (died 1911)
 8 October – Walther Katzenstein, sports rower (died 1929).
 9 November – Álvaro de Castro, politician (died 1928)

Deaths
 6 October – Daniel da Silva, mathematician (born 1814)

References

 
1870s in Portugal
Portugal
Years of the 19th century in Portugal
Portugal